CJ4 may refer to:

Cessna CitationJet CJ4 aircraft
Jeep CJ-4 automobile
CJ-4, a category of motor oil